Mystery of Venus is the sixth extended play by South Korean girl group Hello Venus. It was released on January 11, 2017, by Fantagio Music and distributed by Interpark. The EP consists of four songs, including their previous collaboration with producing and writing team, Devine Channel, with the addition of a new song, "Mysterious", the title track from the EP. To promote the EP, Hello Venus performed "Mysterious" on South Korean music programs, including Music Bank and Inkigayo. A music video for the title track was also released on January 11. This marks their last release before their disbandment in 2019.

The album was a commercial success entering at number 12 on the Gaon Album Chart

Background and release 
On December 14, 2016, it was officially announced by Fantagio, that the group will be making a comeback after a year and six months, in the second week of January 2017, also revealing that was going to be a mini-album. It was also revealed that the recording sessions and the album jacket shoot were finished. Later that month, it was revealed that the new mini-album release date will be on January 11, 2017 and that actor and 5urprise-member Seo Kang Joon will participate in the music video for their title track. On December 30, 2016 it was revealed that the mini-album will be called Mystery of Venus through a teaser image.

On January 1, 2017, a mash-up teaser was released, showing the group dance practice and recording sessions with mash-up of the songs from the upcoming mini-album. They also release another teaser image, mixing all the girls in a single picture. On the same, the track list was also revealed.

The mini-album was released on January 11, 2017 through several music sites in South Korea, such as Melon and on iTunes for the global market.

Music video 
On January 4, 2017, the first music video teaser was released, showing the group in a white background and dressed in shiny jackets of different colors.

The music video was released on January 11, 2017 with the participation of 5urprise's Seo Kangjoon and Astro's Cha Eunwoo.

Promotion 
To promote the EP, Hello Venus performed "Mysterious" on several South Korean music programs. They had their first comeback stage on Mnet's M Countdown on January 12, 2017, followed by KBS's Music Bank on January 13, MBC's Show! Music Core on January 14 and SBS's Inkigayo on January 15.

Commercial performance 
Mystery of Venus debuted and peaked at number 12 on the Gaon Album Chart on the chart issue dated January 8–14, 2017.

The EP entered at number 36 on the chart, for the month of January 2017, with 3,021 physical copies sold.

Track listing

Charts

Weekly charts

Release history

References 

2017 EPs
Interpark Music EPs
Hello Venus albums